Ali Reza Raju (1945 – 16 July 2016) was a Bangladeshi politician and the former Member of Parliament from Jessore-3.

Early life
Raju was born in 1945 in Jessore Sadar Upazila, Jessore District, East Bengal, British Raj.

Career
Raju was elected to Parliament from Jessore-3 as a Bangladesh Awami League candidate in 1996 and served till 2001.

Death
Raju died on 16 July 2016 in the United Hospital, Dhaka.

References

7th Jatiya Sangsad members
1945 births
2016 deaths
Awami League politicians